Sukhyi Stavok is a village in Beryslav Raion, Kherson Oblast, southern Ukraine.

History 

The village came under attack by Russian forces in 2022, during the Russian invasion of Ukraine.

On 29 August 2022 the village was claimed to be liberated by Ukrainian forces during the opening phase of the 2022 Ukrainian southern counteroffensive.

References

Villages in Beryslav Raion